Mixed Blessings, also known as Danielle Steel's Mixed Blessings, is a 1995 American made-for-television romantic drama film directed by Bethany Rooney. The film is based upon the 1993 novel of the same name written by Danielle Steel. It contains three stories of couples who are facing parenthood for the first time.  Scott Baio, Bess Armstrong, Gabrielle Carteris, and Bruce Greenwood lead the all-star cast.

Plot 
Three couples are followed as they struggle to have children. Diana and Andy Douglas are a newlywed couple with great careers trying to have a baby for eleven months, without any results. As they visit the doctor, they are crushed to find out that Diana has problems with her ovary and she has a 1 in 10,000 chance to become pregnant. Diana, who always wanted to have a child, considers finding a surrogate mother, but the process proves to be very painful because Andy always wanted to have a child as well. She thinks she is preventing him from living his dream and files for divorce.

Eventually, Andy convinces Diana that he only wants to be with her and together, they decide to adopt a child. They find Jane, a student who thinks a baby will destroy her promising future. After giving birth to a girl, Hilary, Diana is filled with joy to finally become a mother. Jane, however, changes her mind and claims her baby back. Meanwhile, Diana turns out to be pregnant after all. In the end, she ends up with two children, following Jane's decision not to have the child after all.

Another plot involves Charlie Winwood, an orphan who, like Diana, always wanted to have children. He is married to Barbie, an aspiring actress who isn't too enthusiastic to become a mother. While Barbie is on a vacation in Las Vegas, Charlie makes a visit to the doctor and finds out he is sterile. However, five weeks later, Barbie announces she is pregnant, which means she cheated on him. Charlie immediately leaves her and later meets Beth, another orphan who is now enjoying her life as a single mother. They fall in love with each other and soon marry. Not only does Charlie become the father figure of her child, but they also decide to adopt another child.

The plot also centers on Pilar and Brad Coleman, an older couple who, after Brad's daughter announces she is pregnant, decide to try to become pregnant as well. The age proves to be a great obstacle. Even after an artificial insemination, she suffers a miscarriage. Crushed, she decides not to continue the process, until she becomes pregnant. She eventually delivers twins, but one of them dies.

Cast
 Gabrielle Carteris as Diana Goode Douglas
 Scott Baio as Charlie Winwood
 Bess Armstrong as Pilar Graham Coleman
 Bruce Greenwood as Andy Douglas
 James Naughton as Brad Coleman
 Alexandra Paul as Beth
 Julie Condra as Barbara Elizabeth "Barbie" Chandler
 Barbara Tyson as Gayle Goode
 Ocean Hellman as Sam Goode
 Janne Mortil as Nancy
 Michelle Beaudoin as Jane
 Cassandra Rocan as Baby
 Katelyn Rocan as Baby

Broadcast
Danielle Steel's Mixed Blessings had its world premiere broadcast in Canada on CHCH on December 10, 1995. The film was shown the following night in the U.S. on NBC.

References

External links

1995 films
1995 television films
1995 romantic drama films
American romantic drama films
Films scored by Mark Snow
Films about adoption
Films about families
Films based on American novels
NBC Productions films
Films based on works by Danielle Steel
NBC network original films
American pregnancy films
American drama television films
Films directed by Bethany Rooney
1990s English-language films
1990s American films